The Clandestine Marriage is a 1999 British comedy film directed by Christopher Miles and starring Nigel Hawthorne, Joan Collins, Timothy Spall and Tom Hollander. It is based on the 1766 play The Clandestine Marriage by David Garrick and George Colman. This was also the final role for Nigel Hawthorne before his death.

Cast
 Nigel Hawthorne - Lord Ogleby
 Joan Collins - Mrs. Heidelberg
 Timothy Spall - Sterling
 Tom Hollander - Sir John Ogelby
 Paul Nicholls - Richard Lovewell
 Natasha Little - Fanny
 Emma Chambers - Betsy
 Cyril Shaps - Canton
 Ray Fearon - Brush
 Mark Burns - Capstick
 Timothy Bateson - Gaoler
 Craster Pringle - Ruben
 Lara Harvey - Lucy
 Jenny Galloway - Mrs Trusty
 Philippa Stanton - Chamber
 Cavan Kendall - Sergeant Flower
 Roger Hammond - Traverse

Plot
Mr. Sterling is incredibly wealthy, but to his dismay not an aristocrat. He believes his social status will rise if he marries off his daughter Betsy to an aristocrat. Unknown to him however, his other daughter Fanny has already secretly married the man she loves, her fathers' clerk Richard Lovewell. To complicate matters, she is also pregnant. Sir John Ogleby is presented as a candidate to marry Betsy, and he and his father Lord Ogleby visit Mr. Sterling to make up the contract. Secretly, however, Lord Ogleby is impoverished and needs this marriage to provide his family with new wealth. While preparations are made to celebrate the engagement of Betsy and Sir John, including the building of a new fountain which will be the highlight of the feast and the centre piece of Mr. Sterlings' Rococo garden, Fanny and Richard are trying to find a way to keep their marriage a secret, whilst Sir John seems to be much more interested in Fanny rather than Betsy. In the end, the secrets are out. But all ends well, when Fanny and Richard are forgiven, and Lord Ogleby himself marries Betsy.

References

External links

1999 films
1999 comedy films
Films directed by Christopher Miles
British comedy films
British films based on plays
1990s English-language films
1990s British films